Paroria is a protected area in the Strandzha Mountains of southeastern Bulgaria. It is known for its old-growth forests and also for being a 14th-century monastic center led by Gregory of Sinai and his disciples such as Romylos of Vidin. The Serbian monk Grigorije of Gornjak also lived in Paroria.

Paroriais located just to the west of the villages of Zabernovo and Kalovo in Malko Tarnovo Municipality, Burgas Province (less than 30 km from the border with Turkey).

Monasticism

Paroria is known for being a Christian monastic center in the 14th century. During the mid-1300s, Gregory of Sinai moved from Mount Athos to Paroria with his disciples in order to practice hesychasm. The Bulgarian emperor Ivan Alexander (reigned 1331–1371) gave refuge to Gregory of Sinai and provided funds for the construction of a monastery in Paroria, which attracted clerics from Bulgaria, Byzantium, and Serbia. Gregory founded the monastery in 1330 and died in Paroria in 1346.

During that time, Paroria became second only to Mount Athos in its importance as a center for the practice and dissemination of hesychasm.

See also
Strandzha Nature Park
Monastic community of Mount Athos
Kilifarevo
Grigorije of Gornjak

References

 

Strandzha
Protected areas of Bulgaria
Places associated with hesychasm
History of Christianity in Bulgaria
Geography of Burgas Province
14th century in Bulgaria
Monasteries of the Byzantine Empire
Mountains associated with Byzantine monasticism
Forests of Bulgaria
Gregory of Sinai